Mikołaj II Radziwiłł (1470–1521), nicknamed Amor Poloniae, was a magnate and statesman of the Grand Duchy of Lithuania.

He obtained the title of prince from Emperor Maximilian I.
He was a son of Mikalojus Radvilaitis and among the first Radziwiłłs to carry this family name. He had brothers Jerzy Radziwiłł, Jan Radziwiłł and Wojciech Radziwiłł  and sister Anna Radziwiłł. Mikołaj was a progenitor of Goniądz–Meteliai Radziwiłł family line. He inherited the lands of Musninkai and Kėdainiai. Most of his acquired fortune had been confiscated from Michael Glinski—notably Raigardas, Goniądz and Knyszyn.

He took part in the second Muscovite–Lithuanian War of 1500–03 and other raids under leadership of Konstanty Ostrogski. Mikołaj was the Podczaszy from 1505 until 1510, Voivode of Vilnius from 1507 and replaced his father as the Grand Chancellor of Lithuania from 1510. On 25 February 1518 received, as the first member of the family, the princely title from the emperor Maximilian I, as Reichsfürst ("Imperial Prince") of Goniądz and Meteliai.

Due to his pro-Polish views and arid support for the Polish–Lithuanian Union he was nicknamed Amor Poloniae by his contemporaries. He rivaled Albertas Goštautas for influence in the government of the Grand Duchy of Lithuania and was the initial editor of the First Statute of Lithuania.

Marriage and issue
Mikołaj married Elźbieta Anna Sakowicz h. Pomian (daughter of the boyar Bohdan Sakowicz, who was adopted by the Pomian clan) their children were:

 Mikołaj Radziwiłł, Bishop of Samogitia 
 Jan Radziwiłł; married Anna Kostewicz h. Leliwa
 Zofia Radziwiłł; married Jan Zabrzeziński h. Leliwa
 Stanisław Radziwiłł; married Magdalena Boner h. Boner in 1527 in Kraków
 Helena Radziwiłł; married Prince Jerzy Olelkowicz Słucki
 Elżbieta Radziwiłł; married Prince Iwan Dubrownicki Holszański

References

1470 births
1521 deaths
Mikolaj Radziwill
Grand Chancellors of the Grand Duchy of Lithuania
Grand Marshals of the Grand Duchy of Lithuania
Voivode of Vilnius